Wils may refer to:

Jan Wils (1891-1972), a Dutch architect
Jean-Pierre Wils, a Belgian theologian 
Stef Wils, a Belgian footballer
WILS, a radio station in Lansing, Michigan, US
 Wils, Singaporean singer